Eudoxus may refer to:

Eudoxus of Cnidus (c. 395–390 BC – c. 342–337 BC), Greek astronomer and mathematician, student of Plato
Eudoxus of Cyzicus (fl. c. 130 BC), Greek navigator who explored the Arabian Sea for Ptolemy VIII of Egypt
Eudoxus (lunar crater)
Eudoxus (Martian crater)

See also
11709 Eudoxos, asteroid
Eudoxia (name)
Charaxes eudoxus, an African butterfly